Agnes Dahlström (born 28 November 1991) is a Swedish footballer defender who plays for Kvarnsvedens IK.

External links 
 

1991 births
Living people
Swedish women's footballers
Damallsvenskan players
Women's association football defenders
Kvarnsvedens IK players
Elitettan players
21st-century Swedish women